This article uses Logar transcription.

The Čabranka dialect, also known in Croatian literature as western microdialects of the Western Goran subdialect,  is a dialect spoken along the Upper Kupa Valley and in Gorski Kotar in Slovenia and Croatia. The dialect originates from Alpine Slavic, a predecessor of modern Slovene, but speakers living in Croatia self-identify as speaking Croatian. The dialect borders the Lower Carniolan dialect to the north, the Mixed Kočevje subdialects to the northeast, the Kostel dialect to the southeast, the Eastern Goran dialect to the south, and various Chakavian dialects to the southwest and west. The dialect belongs to the Lower Carniolan dialect group, and it evolved from the Lower Carniolan dialect base. Until recently, the Čabranka dialect was considered to be part of the Kostel dialect, but it was later discovered that both dialects had evolved differently but are in the process of becoming more similar to each other. Despite the new name, it is still often referred to as the Western Kostel microdialects.

Geographical distribution 
The Čabranka dialect is mainly spoken in Croatia; however, the northeastern part crosses the border between Croatia and Slovenia. The area extends from Babno Polje and Lazec in the north along the Gotenica Mountains to Mirtoviči and Gašparci in the east. It extends south to Delnice and extends west to Gorski Kotar. Notable settlements include Babno Polje, Lazec, Novi Kot, Draga, and Osilnica in Slovenia, as well as Prezid, Kozji Vrh, Gorači, Čabar, Crni Lazi, Tršće, Plešce, Vode, Gerovo, Mali Lazi, and Crni Lug in Croatia.

Accentual changes 
The Čabranka dialect lost the difference between high- and low-pitched accent on both long and short vowels, which are still differentiated, but in the process of merging in the Čabar, Hrvatsko, and Bosljiva Loka microdialects. It also underwent five accentual changes that are not found in all Slovene dialects: the  → ,  → ,  /  →  / , *visȍk → vìsok, and  →  accent shifts. Some Bajtarji microdialects have also undergone the  →  accent shift. The northwesternmost microdialects of Babno Polje and Prezid have also undergone the shift  →  in a few words. Newly accented vowels have usually been majorly reduced, and akanye is common.

Phonology 
Monophthongization of vowels is present; however in contrast to the Kostel dialect, diphthongs are still present:

 Non-final  and  turned into .
 Non-final  and  turned into  almost everywhere.
 Non-final  and  became either long or short .
 Non-final  and  became either long or short  or even .
 Non-final  and  mostly evolved into .

Akanye is also common, as well as e-akanye in the prefix .

Shvapanye ( →  before central and back consonants) is also common, but not before . Palatal  mostly depalatalized. Palatal  depalatalized at the beginning of a word. Final  turned into . Alpine Slovene  evolved into many different sounds:

 Before a non-voiced (rarely also voiced) non-sonorant, it became .
 Prothetic  appeared before  at the beginning of a word.
 Prothetic  appeared before  at the beginning of a word.
 The cluster  simplified into .
 Southern microdialects simplified  into .

Some microdialects pronounce / as /.

Morphology 
Dual forms have been fully replaced by plural endings in declension; verbs have archaic dual forms. The infinitive was replaced by the supine, and the pluperfect is still in use. The imperative can be alternatively formed with  + infinitive, or  + infinitive for the first person plural.

Further division 
The Čabranka dialect is further divided into three groups: the Bajtarji, Dragarji, and Gebarji microdialects. The Dragarji microdialects lack shvapanye and are the smallest group, spoken in Lazec, Srednja Vas pri Dragi, Trava, and Čabar. These speakers are thought to have moved here from inner Slovenia. The Bajtarji microdialects have undergone the most vowel reduction; akanye is very common, as well as the shifts  → ,  → , etc. This group covers the largest area, from Babno Polje in the north to Gerovo and Osilnica in the south. South of the Bajtarji microdialects are the Gebarji microdialects, which have not undergone as much vowel reduction; akanye is only present in pretonic syllables.

References

Bibliography 

 
 
 
Slovene dialects